

Events

January
 January 1 – Creation of the following European railway networks under government control:
 SNCF (Société Nationale des Chemins de fer Français), bringing the principal railway companies of France together.
 NS (Nederlandsche Spoorwegen), merging the Hollandsche IJzeren Spoorweg-Maatschappij (HSM) and the Maatschappij tot Exploitatie van Staatsspoorwegen (SS) in the Netherlands.
 January 22 – The Pacific Electric Whittier Line is truncated to Walker.

February
 February 22 – The Atchison, Topeka and Santa Fe Railway introduces the El Capitan passenger train between Chicago and Los Angeles.
 February 26 – A second all-lightweight trainset enters service on the Super Chief.

March 
 March 6 – The Pacific Electric Walker Line is discontinued.
 March 18 – Bundesbahn Österreich (BBÖ, Federal Railway of Austria) integrated into Deutsche Reichsbahn.
 March 27 – Atchison, Topeka and Santa Fe Railway inaugurates the San Diegan passenger train between Los Angeles and San Diego.

May 
 May 8 — President Manuel L. Quezon inaugurates regular services on the Main Line South of the Manila Railroad in Del Gallego, Camarines Sur. Trial runs already began five months prior.
 May 15
 The Lake Shore Electric Railway in Ohio ceases operations.
 Inauguration of a major Nederlandse Spoorwegen electrification scheme in the central Netherlands, centred on Utrecht.

June 
 June 1 – Pacific Electric's Owensmouth Line and San Fernando Line are truncated to Sherman Way.
 June 15 – New York Central Railroad introduces an all-streamlined consist on the 20th Century Limited and also introduces the New England States passenger train between Chicago and Boston.
 June 16 – The Pike's Peak Cog Railway in Colorado operates gasoline-powered railcar number 7, the first rack railcar in the world, for the first time.
 June 19 – Custer Creek train wreck kills at least 47 near Saugus, Montana. A bridge, weakened by a flash flood, collapses under the Milwaukee Road's Olympian plunging the locomotive and seven lead cars into the rain-swollen creek. It remains the worse rail disaster in Montana history.  
 June 30 – London Underground 1938 Stock enters public service, on Northern line.

July
 July 3 – The London and North Eastern Railway 4-6-2 Mallard reaches a speed of 126 mph (203 km/h), the highest certified speed for a steam locomotive.

 July 31 – The Pennsylvania Railroad, in its public timetable issued today, boasts that “19% of all passengers are carried on the Pennsylvania Railroad.”

October
 October – Electro-Motive Corporation introduces the EMC E4.

November
 November 1 – Passenger service ends on the Maine narrow gauge Monson Railroad.

December
 December 13 – The Reading Railroad's Crusader passenger train is introduced.
 December 15
 The first diesel locomotives in the southeast United States, EMC E4s, appear on the Orange Blossom Special.
 The second section of the Itō Line, connecting Ajiro to Itō in Japan, opens.
 December 23 – Jean Renoir's film of La Bête Humaine released in France.

Unknown date
 Pennsylvania Railroad's Broadway Limited is completely re-equipped based on an industrial design by Raymond Loewy.
 Overhead wire on the Pennsylvania Railroad's mainline from New York City reaches Harrisburg, Pennsylvania.
 Overhead wire on the newly formed SNCF system between Tours and Bordeaux in France completes electrification from Paris to the Spanish frontier.
 The first passenger car equipped with fluorescent lights is operated on the New York Central Railroad.

Births

January births 
 January 11 – Alastair Morton, chief executive of Eurotunnel 1987–1996, chairman of British Strategic Rail Authority 1999-2001 (d. 2004).

Unknown date births
 John H. Kuehl, editor of Private Varnish magazine, passenger car historian and photographer (died 2005).

Deaths

February deaths
 February 2 – Frederick William Vanderbilt, director of the New York Central system (born 1856).
 February 9 – Arturo Caprotti, Italian inventor of Caprotti valve gear for steam locomotives (born 1881).

October deaths
 October 16 – Sir Henry Fowler, Chief Mechanical Engineer of the Midland Railway 1909–1923 and the London, Midland and Scottish Railway 1925–1931 (born 1870).

December deaths
 December 1 – David Blyth Hanna, first president of Canadian National Railway (born 1858).

Accidents

References